Ali Mirzaei (28 January 1929 – 18 July 2020) was an Iranian weightlifter who competed in the 56 kg category.

His greatest achievement was winning the bronze medal in the 1952 Summer Olympics in Helsinki). He won twice a medal at the World Championships. The silver medal in Milan at the 1951 World Weightlifting Championships and the bronze medal three years later in Vienna at the 1954 World Weightlifting Championships. He won the silver medal at the 1951 Asian Games.

During his career Mirzaei set 1 world record.

References

External links
 
 
 

1929 births
2020 deaths
Iranian male weightlifters
World Weightlifting Championships medalists
Olympic weightlifters of Iran
Olympic bronze medalists for Iran
Olympic medalists in weightlifting
Weightlifters at the 1952 Summer Olympics
Medalists at the 1952 Summer Olympics
Asian Games silver medalists for Iran
Asian Games medalists in weightlifting
Weightlifters at the 1951 Asian Games
Medalists at the 1951 Asian Games
20th-century Iranian people